Harry Brautigam (October 29, 1948 in Bluefields, Nicaragua – May 30, 2008 in Tegucigalpa, Honduras) was a Nicaraguan economist, banker and academic.

Biography
Harry Emil Brautigam, son of Harry and Lucille Brautigam, was born and raised in Bluefields, Nicaragua. He received a bachelor's degree in Business Administration in Guadalajara, Mexico. Harry was then awarded a British Council Scholarship and went on to receive a postgraduate diploma in Manchester, England. He finalized his master's degree in economics at the University of Leeds and later received a Ph.D. in agriculture economics from the University of Illinois in the United States.

While abroad in England, he met Marilyn Gerald, whom he later married in Nicaragua in 1976.
  
They had their first child, Harry Emil Brautigam, in Managua, Nicaragua, in 1978. Soon after, they returned to the United States, where Harry accepted a position as a professor of economics at the University of Delaware. In 1981, their second child, Claire, was born. They moved to Boston, Massachusetts, where Harry commenced his banking career at the Bank of Boston and welcomed their last child, Anna, in 1984.

A year later, the family moved to Miami, where Harry accepted a position at Bank of America. They were relocated to San Francisco for four years, later returning to Miami. Harry made another professional move to Barclays Bank in 1988. On September 1, 2003, Harry Brautigam was elected president of the Banco Centroamericano de Integración Económica (BCIE) in Tegucigalpa, Honduras, where he and his wife resided for five years. He was the first elected president of the BCIE,( the result of an international search of qualified candidates). Through his leadership, BCIE was able to reach important achievements that helped to position the institution as the main provider of resources for the region. It was a fulfillment of a life goal to be able to use his knowledge and experience to help improve his home country, Nicaragua, as well as the rest of Central America. He was decorated by the Colombian government and awarded the Order of Ruben Dario by the Nicaraguan government.

Brautigam served as president of BCIE until his death on May 30, 2008, as a result of the TACA Flight 390 airliner crash at the Toncontín International Airport in Tegucigalpa, Honduras.

References 

1948 births
2008 deaths
People from Bluefields
Nicaraguan economists
Nicaraguan academics
Nicaraguan emigrants to the United States
Alumni of the University of Leeds
University of Illinois College of Agriculture, Consumer, and Environmental Sciences alumni
University of Delaware faculty
People from Miami
Nicaraguan bankers
Victims of aviation accidents or incidents in Honduras
20th-century American businesspeople
21st-century American businesspeople